June Niño Mendoza Macasaet (born June 8, 1983), popularly known as June Macasaet, is a Filipino model and male pageant titleholder who was crowned Manhunt International 2012 in Bangkok, Thailand.  He is the first Filipino to win the international male beauty pageant, and also holds the record for the longest reign (approximately 4 years) in the history of the competition, thus far.

Personal life
Macasaet is the eldest of four siblings. He was a college varsity basketball player and a BS Marketing graduate of Centro Escolar University-Manila.

Pageantry

Manhunt International Philippines 2012
Macasaet was named the winner of Manhunt International Philippines 2012 in the search held in Makati, Philippines.

Manhunt International 2012
Macasaet was crowned Manhunt International 2012 in Bangkok, Thailand, making him the first Filipino to win the title of Manhunt International since its creation in 1993. He bested 52 other candidates from around the world. Macasaet also received the special award for "Best Urban Male Ambassador". For now, he is the longest reigning Manhunt International. He reigned for 4 years until a new winner from Sweden was crowned in 2016.

Career
Macasaet was a professional model prior to joining pageants, but had more commercials, endorsements, and TV guestings after his Manhunt International triumph. His first acting appearance was in the daytime drama, Be Careful With My Heart (2013), followed by his appearance in the primetime fantasy drama, Dyesebel (2014). He co-hosted the reality show, Day Off of GMA News TV, along with beauty queen Ariella Arida in 2014. He appeared in the films Bekikang: Ang Nanay Kong Beki and Maria Leonora Teresa in 2013 and 2014 respectively.

In 2014, Macasaet bags the Asian Top Fashion Male Model of the Year representing the Philippines at the Fashion Asia Awards 2014 in China.

See also
Manhunt International Philippines

References

External links
 
 

Filipino beauty pageant winners
Manhunt International winners
Filipino male models
Living people
People from Lipa, Batangas
1983 births
Centro Escolar University alumni
Male beauty pageant winners